Elisabetta Pellini (born 6 April 1974) is an Italian actress and model. She is best known for playing Laura in the Italian TV series Le tre rose di eva.

Filmography 
 Cucciolo, directed by Neri Parenti (1998)
 Il cielo in una stanza, directed by Carlo Vanzina (1999)
 Denti, directed by Gabriele Salvatores (2000)
 Amici ahrarara, directed by Franco Amurri (2001)
 Forever, directed by Alessandro Di Robilant (2003)
 Non sono io, directed by Gabriele Iacovone (2003)
 Balletto di guerra, directed by Mario Rellini (2004)
 Don't Make Any Plans for Tonight, directed by Gianluca Maria Tavarelli (2006)
 Un giorno perfetto, directed by Ferzan Özpetek (2008)
 I fiori di Kirkuk, directed by Fariborz Kamkari (2009)
 Cara, ti amo..., directed by Gian Paolo Vallati (2011)
Il cantico di Maddalena, directed by Mauro Campiotti, (2011)
 Mi rifaccio vivo, directed by Sergio Rubini (2013)
 Midway - Tra la vita e la morte, directed by John Real (2013)
 Infernet, directed by Giuseppe Ferlito - Role: Arianna (2015)

Television
 L'ispettore Giusti, by Sergio Martino - serie TV (1999)
 Cornetti al miele, by Sergio Martino - film TV (1999)
 Il maresciallo Rocca 3, by Giorgio Capitani - serie TV (2000)
 Ricominciare- Soap opera (2000)
 Per amore per vendetta, by Mario Caiano - serie TV (2000)
 Una donna per amico 3, by Rossella Izzo - miniserie TV (2001)
 Compagni di scuola, by Tiziana Aristarco e Claudio Norza - serie TV (2001)
 Incantesimo 5, by Alessandro Cane e Leandro Castellani - serie TV (2002)
 Elisa di Rivombrosa 2, by Cinzia Th. Torrini e Stefano Alleva - serie TV (2005)
 Questa è la mia terra, by Raffaele Mertes - miniserie TV (2006)
 Un ciclone in famiglia 2, by Carlo Vanzina - miniserie televisiva (2006)
 Eravamo solo mille, by Stefano Reali - miniserie televisiva (2006)
 Distretto di polizia 7, by Alessandro Capone e Davide Dapporto - serie TV (2007)
 Un medico in famiglia 5, by Ugo Fabrizio Giordani, Isabella Leoni ed Elisabetta Marchetti - serie TV (2007)
 Senza via d'uscita - Un amore spezzato, by Giorgio Serafini - miniserie TV (2007)
 Rex, by Marco Serafini - serie TV (2008)
 Il commissario De Luca, by Antonio Frazzi - miniserie TV - Episode: Indagine non autorizzata (2008)
 Il mistero del lago, by Marco Serafini - film TV (2009)
 Piloti, by Celeste Laudisio - Sit-com (2009)
 Un coccodrillo per amico, by Francesca Marra - film TV (2009)
 Le cose che restano, byi Gianluca Maria Tavarelli - miniserie TV (2009)
 Capri 3, by  Dario Acocella and Francesca Marra - serie TV (2010)
 Il restauratore, by Giorgio Capitani (2011)
 Un amore e una vendetta, by Raffaele Mertes - serie TV (2011). Ruolo: Olga Bernardi. 
 6 passi nel giallo - Souvenirs, by Lamberto Bava - film TV (2012)
 Le tre rose di Eva - serie TV (2012) - Role: Laura Sommariva
 Il paese delle piccole piogge - film TV (2012)
 Rosso San Valentino, by Fabrizio Costa - serie TV (2013)
 Provaci ancora Prof 5, by Tiziana Aristarco - serie TV (2013)
 Le tre rose di Eva 2 - serie TV (2013) - Role: Laura Sommariva
 Madre, aiutami, by Gianni Lepre - miniserie TV (2014)
 Le tre rose di Eva 3 - serie TV (2014) - Role: Laura Sommariva
 Provaci ancora Prof 6, by Enrico Oldoini and Francesca Marra - serie TV (2015)
 Don Matteo 10, - Serie TV (2015)

References

External links 
 

1974 births
Living people
Italian actresses